Bernières may refer to:

Places

France
Bernières, Seine-Maritime, in the Seine-Maritime département
Bernières-d'Ailly in the Calvados département
Bernières-le-Patry in the Calvados département
Bernières-sur-Mer in the Calvados département
Bernières-sur-Seine in the Eure département

Canada
Bernières municipality in the district of Saint-Nicolas, Quebec

People
Henri de Bernières (c.1635–1700), French Catholic priest, first resident pastor of Quebec
Louis de Bernières (born 1954), British novelist

See also
Berners